Temotu Noi (also known as Nibanga) is an island in the Solomon Islands; it is located in Temotu Province and is a part of Santa Cruz Islands archipelago. The island has a crocodile-infested freshwater lake. The large neighboring island is Nendo.

References

Islands of the Solomon Islands
Polynesian outliers